Kittenpants was an online humor magazine published monthly from 2000 to 2007 on Kittenpants.com.

History and profile
Kittenpants was founded in 2000 by Darci Ratliff, who also wrote under the name Kittenpants for other publications, including the Comedy Central Insider. Her style was described by the Seattle Post-Intelligencer as "a mix of ridicule of others and self-deprecation."

The magazine featured the work of writers who have since gone on to work for Comedy Central, McSweeney's, Late Night with Jimmy Fallon, and The Onion's AV Club. It also featured the early short films of Tim Heidecker and Eric Wareheim of Tim and Eric Awesome Show, Great Job!.  Each issue of Kittenpants featured an interview with an actor, comedian, musician or filmmaker, including David Cross, Devo, Bruce Campbell, and several members of MTV's The State.

In 2003, the Kittenpants CD, Kitty Kitty Bang Bang, was released on Seattle's Guns A Blazin' record label. It featured bands from Denton, Texas, including the Riverboat Gamblers and Centro-matic. The same year also marked the beginning of Kittenpants Productions, as Ratliff began work as a producer for independent films.

In 2007, Ratliff published If I Did It: The Kittenpants Anthology, a collection of articles and interviews from the magazine.

Selected former staff
Corn Mo
Mark Hedman of Centro-Matic
Tim Heidecker
Will Johnson
Darci Ratliff
Eric Wareheim

Selected interviews

Todd Barry
H. Jon Benjamin
Michael Ian Black
Joe Bob Briggs
Bruce Campbell
Gerald Casale of DEVO
Centro-Matic
David Cross
Eddie Deezen
Tim DeLaughter
John Flansburgh of They Might Be Giants
Keith Gordon

Gary Gygax
Calvin Johnson
Jordan Knight
Pat Mastroianni
Eugene Mirman
Brian Posehn
Andy Richter
Dan Savage
Michael Showalter
David Wain
Dave Willis and Matt Maiellaro, creators of Aqua Teen Hunger Force

References

Defunct magazines published in the United States
Humor magazines
Magazines established in 2000
Magazines disestablished in 2007
Monthly magazines published in the United States
Online magazines published in the United States